Longing is a 2013 play by the Scottish writer William Boyd, based on the short stories My Life ("The Story of a Provincial") and "A Visit to Friends" by the Russian author Anton Chekhov. Its premiere production ran at the Hampstead Theatre in London from 28 February to 6 April 2013 (with the  press night on 7 March), directed by Nina Raine and starring Tamsin Greig, Iain Glen, John Sessions, Jonathan Bailey, Natasha Little, Eve Ponsonby and Catrin Stewart. Boyd, who was theatre critic for the University of Glasgow in the 1970s and has many actor friends, refers to his ambition to write a play as finally getting "this monkey off my back".

Michael Billington, theatre critic for The Guardian, said that the play is "something of a hybrid: neither pure Boyd nor pure Chekhov. But it works because it deals with eternal Russian themes – and because it is performed with rare musical precision".

However, Clare Brennan, for The Observer, said: "Boyd tacks circumstantial details to plotline shreds then trims characters to fit his pattern. The result is not a patch on the originals."

References

External links
Official website

Lawson, Mark (20 March 2013). "Why Chekhov has never been busier", The Guardian. Retrieved 16 April 2020. 

2010s debut plays
2013 in theatre
2013 plays
Plays based on short fiction
Plays based on works by Anton Chekhov
Plays by William Boyd (writer)